The Maas-Schwalm-Nette Nature Park or NMSM is a cross-border nature park in Germany and the Netherlands, which was founded in 2002. It is a regionally important recreation area.

Description 
The park has an area of 870 km². Its name comes from the major rivers that flow through it, the Maas (English: Meuse), Schwalm and Nette.

The park is often confused with the Schwalm-Nette Nature Park which was founded in 1965 and has since been integrated into the NMSN.

It covers an area that includes the counties of Kleve, Viersen and Heinsberg as well as the town of Mönchengladbach in Germany and in the municipalities of Roermond, Roerdalen, Venlo, Echt-Susteren, Leudal and Maasgouw in the Netherlands.

Within the Maas-Schwalm-Nette Nature Park is the nature reserve of Krickenbecker Seen with its four lakes that were formed by peat cutting. On the territory of Niederkrüchten lies the only juniper heath of the Lower Rhine Region, surrounded by the Elmpter Schwalmbruch. In addition the Kaldenkirchen Border Forest (Nettetal) with its arboretum, the Sequoia Farm and the geo-hydrological water garden is part of the park.

21 visitor centres provide information about the landscape, art, nature, culture and history of the park. Numerous excursions and activities are also offered.

Its water balance was and is affected by the brown coal open-cast pits south of Mönchengladbach. After the Garzweiler I pit had been exhausted, work began on Garzweiler II. This is slowly approaching Mönchengladbach and also the NMSN.

Information centres 

 in Germany
 Haus Püllen nature park centre in Wachtendonk
 Krickenbecker Seen information centre in Nettetal
 Nature park information point at Brüggen Castle
 Wildenrath Nature Park Centre near Wegberg
 in the Netherlands
 Groote Heide information centre near Venlo
 Visitor centre of the De Meinweg National Park near Herkenbosch

Nature reserve facilities 
 NABU  nature reserve centre (Naturschutzhof) in Nettetal-Sassenfeld
 NABU nature reserve station at Haus Wildenrath

Museums and other facilities 
 in Germany
 Lower Rhine Open-Air Museum in Grefrath
 Die Scheune Textile Museum in Nettetal-Hombergen
 Landschaftshof Baerlo in Nettetal-Leutherheide with "green classroom"
 Geo-hydrological water garden in Nettetal-Kaldenkirchen
 Kaldenkirchen Sequoia Farm – arboretum
 Hunting and natural history museum, Brüggen Castle, Brüggen
 Schrofmühle mill in Wegberg-Rickelrath
 Beecker Flax Museum in Beeck (Wegberg)
 in the Netherlands
 Kinderboerderij Hagehof near Venlo, a farm for children
 Botanische Tuin, Jochum-Hof in Steyl has hiesige plants and a Mediterranean garten
 Visitor centre Towana en keramiekcentrum Tiendschuur in Tegelen offers insights into the hiesige manufacture of pottery
 De Kookboerderij en De Historische Groentehof in Beesel; a cooking studio in an old farmyard
 St. Elisabethshof NME Centre en Strekkmuseum Leudal in Haelen with local history museum
 The Roerstreek Museum in Roermond with inter alia archaeological finds
 Das Bijen visitor centre in Mariahoop provides information on the world of bees

Film 
 Bilderbuch Germany: Der Nature parks Maas-Schwalm-Nette. Documentary, 45 min., a film by Tilman Jens, produced by: WDR, first broadcast: 8 July 2007, Contents

See also 
 List of nature parks in Germany
 List of lakes of Germany

References

External links 

 Maas-Schwalm-Nette Nature Park
 Schwalm-Nette Nature Park

Nature parks in North Rhine-Westphalia
Parks in Limburg (Netherlands)
Heinsberg (district)
Viersen (district)
Mönchengladbach
Roerdalen
Roermond
Venlo
Protected areas established in 2002
2002 establishments in Germany
2002 establishments in the Netherlands